The Fédération Internationale de Motocyclisme (FIM), the global governing body of motorcycle racing is the premier category for international stadium Supercross.

History
The series has its roots in the Rodil Trophy which was elevated to World Championship status in 1987. References to Rodil were removed in 1992 as the series became the FIM World Supercross Championship.  From 2002 to 2006 in partnership with American-owned promoters Clear Channel Entertainment  the series was staged in countries such as Switzerland, Holland, Spain and Canada as well as the United States (which had its own prestugious national championship) as the World Supercross GP before the series merged with the AMA Supercross Championship to form the Monster Energy AMA Supercross, an FIM World Championship.

In 2022, the FIM World Supercross Championship split from the AMA and was re-booted by Australian promoters SX Global, a highly credentialed Australian company, to manage and promote the FIM World Supercross Championship over the coming decade.

Calendar 
The 2022 FIM World Supercross Championship began in October for the pilot season that consisted of 2 rounds. Round 1 of FIM World Supercross Championship was the British Grand Prix on October 8th to be held at Principality Stadium, Cardiff, Wales. Round 2 of the Championship was the Australian Grand Prix which is two day event scheduled on Friday 21st and Saturday 22 October 2022 held at Marvel Stadium, Melbourne.

The series will start again in July 2023 and continue through until November, consisting of 6 rounds in both the WSX (450cc) class and the SX2 (250cc) class, to be held in football and baseball stadiums across the world. Beginning with Round 1 in July 2023, the series will take place in different locations globally before concluding in Melbourne for the final round of the Championship in November.

2023 Championship Calendar

Round 1: British GP - Villa Park in Birmingham on July 1st 

Round 2: French GP - Groupama Stadium in Décines-Charpieu, Lyon on July 22nd

Round 3: Asian GP - Location TBC on September 30th 

Round 4: German GP - Merkur Spiel-Arena, Düsseldorf on October 14th 

Round 5: Canadian GP - BC Place in Vancouver on October 28th 

Round 6: Australian GP - Marvel Stadium, Melbourne on Novemner 24th and 25th

Event Format 
The non-traditional format features more races and shorter race durations, significantly increasing the overall level of action and excitement, while minimising downtime for fans throughout events. Highlighting the competitive format are three Main Event races for each class, with the combined individual results of each Main Event determining each Championship Round winner for both the WSX and SX2 classes. The three, back-to-back Main Event format and shorter race durations significantly increases the overall level of intensity and unpredictability at every Championship round and makes getting effective starts and hole shots all the more critical. Much of this format has been tested successfully at SX Global-produced AUS-X Open events, with incredibly positive feedback from riders and fans alike.”

In addition, the WSX class will feature a SuperPole round – an individual time trial format, featuring the top 10 WSX heat race finishers, to determine the order for the Main Event races. Combined with adjacent entertainment, including live music and freestyle motocross exhibitions, the unique format translates into an unparalleled level of entertainment for fans at every WSX Championship round soon.

Race Schedule

The competitive format at WSX Championship rounds breaks down as follows:

Qualifying Session

WSX and SX2 fields will each be split into two separate timed qualifying sessions, with individual lap times determining the order for each class’ heat races. Each qualifying session will last 10 minutes, with final laps run to completion once the 10-minute session expires.

Heat Races

WSX class heat races will determine the order for the SuperPole – a time-trial format exclusive to the WSX class that will determine the order of its Main Event round. The top five finishers in each of the two WSX heat races will earn a spot in the 10-rider SuperPole. The sixth to 11th-place finishers in each heat will fill spots 11–22 in the gate pick order for the main event, with the faster overall heat taking precedent and gate picks alternating between the remaining riders.

For the SX2 class, in the same manner as with traditional supercross formats, heat races will determine the order for the main event. Collectively, the faster overall heat will take precedent, with gate pick choice for the Main Event alternating between the finishing order of the two SX2 heats.

SuperPole

Exclusive to the WSX class, the SuperPole round will feature 10 riders – the top-five finishers from the two WSX heat races. Featuring an individual time-trial format, lap times from the SuperPole round will determine the gate pick order of the top 10 for the WSX Main Event races.

Main Events

Each WSX Championship round will see riders contest three ‘back-to-back’ Main Event races for each class, with only a short 5-minute break between each. The combined individual results determining the winner and podium spots for each Championship Round.

Championship Points

FIM World Supercross Championship points will be awarded for each of the three Main Event races. Points will follow the traditional supercross format of 25, 22 and 20, 18 and 16 points respectively for first through fifth place, with the remaining 17 riders earning from 15 points to 1 point, depending on where they finish. It total, a maximum of 75 FIM World Championship Points are up for grabs at each WSX Championship round.

In addition to the Main Event races, the fastest SX2 qualifier and the winner of the WSX Superpole will be awarded one additional Championship point.

Practice Sessions

As with traditional supercross event formats, practice sessions will take place during afternoons for the enjoyment of fans who arrive earlier and want to enjoy as much action as possible.

Television coverage 

7plus: All races live and free

 Europe
Viaplay every race live
WSX.tv: races on 24hr delay

BT Sport: Every race live

Fox Sports 1: Every race live
WSX.tv: races on 24hr delay

 International (territories without a distinct partner):
WSX.tv: all races live

Roll of honour

References

Motorcycle off-road racing series
Motocross World Championship